Nelly Prono (August 7, 1926 - August 29, 1997) was a Paraguayan actress who had a long career in Argentine theatre, radio, television and film.

She began in Argentine theatre in 1947 with María Esther Podestá. She appeared in productions such as Françoise Billetdoux's Noche de noche, Florencio Sánchez's Barranca abajo, Jacobo Langsner's Una margarita llamada Mercedes in which she appeared opposite China Zorrilla, Bertolt Brecht's Contra la seducción, and Marisé Monteiro's Hoy llega Ezequiel, among others. In the 1970s and 1980s she enjoyed a film career, appearing in pictures such as Pájaro loco (1971),  Papá Corazón se quiere casar (1974), Los enemigos (1983), and Fernando Ayala's Pasajeros de una pesadilla (1984), among others. In television one of her notable roles was in Andrea Celeste, with Andrea Del Boca. She died in 1997 after a stroke and a period in a vegetative state.

Filmography
 Setenta veces siete (1962) .... La dueña
 Psexoanálisis (1968)
 Deliciosamente amoral (1969)
 El señor Presidente (1969) 
 Los mochileros (1970)
 Pájaro loco (1971)
 La gran ruta (1971)
 Papá Corazón se quiere casar (1974)
 Comedia rota (1978)
 Cuatro pícaros bomberos (1979)
 El poder de las tinieblas (1979)
 Este loco amor loco (1979)
 Los enemigos (1983)
 Pasajeros de una pesadilla (1984) .... Carmen
 Gracias por el fuego (1984)
 Otra historia de amor (1986)
 Tómame (1992)
 La revelación (1996)
 Comodines (1997)

References

1926 births
1997 deaths
20th-century Paraguayan actresses
Paraguayan emigrants to Argentina
Paraguayan film actresses
Paraguayan stage actresses